Ducal is a Luxembourgish brand of cigarettes, currently owned and manufactured by "Landewyck Tobacco".

History
Ducal was founded in 1969 by Landewyck Tobacco in response to the price war.  The price war emerged around the 1960s in the cigarette market.  This was a time smokers opted to go for filtered and king size 25-pack cigarettes instead of the traditional 20-packs. The brand became very popular from the 1970s onward and is one of the most popular regional brands, along with Lexington.

Advertising
Various adverts were made for Ducal, such as ashtrays, billboards and advertising pins.

Controversy
In 2014, two young E-cigarette businessmen named their product "Ducal", similar to the traditional cigarette brand. Currently, Ducal is protected under class 34 of the International Classification of Goods and Services, namely that of tobacco and smokers. However, the same law also falls under the field of which the electronic cigarette sits. As of January 2018 a judge has yet to decide whether or not the name is a breach of the brand protection law.

Markets
The brand is mainly sold in Luxembourg, but also was or still is sold in Belgium, Netherlands (as rolling tobacco), Germany and Peru.

See also

 Tobacco smoking

References

Cigarette brands